Charles Brandle Crate (1916–1992) was a Canadian fascist who was the leader of the Canadian Union of Fascists. He later served in the Royal Canadian Navy and eventually became a teacher.

Early years 
Crate was born and grew up in northern Ontario, moving into a working-class district of Toronto in 1927. The poverty and unemployment brought by the Great Depression turned the young Crate into a radical, in his youth sympathizing with the then populist fascist movement of Europe.

Career 
Crate was editor of The Thunderbolt in Winnipeg, Manitoba, in which he blamed the conditions of the time on Jews, the Roman Catholic Church and the Masonic Order.

During the war, Chuck Crate joined the Royal Canadian Navy where he worked in Postal Service and as a gunner. He was based in Scotland where he met his future wife. Crate worked for many years after World War II as a gold miner and Mine Mill and Smelter Worker shop steward and union organizer where he secured equal pay for Native Indian workers in the mines. During this time he met Charles Lovell and began a lifelong interest in Canadian English lexicography and Canadiana literature which later led to the publication of A Dictionary of Canadianisms on Historical Principles.  Crate worked in and for numerous unions until he retired and became a member of the Co-operative Commonwealth Federation party.
In Yellowknife, he was instrumental in starting the (Indian) Friendship Center as well a public library and started a local newspaper called the Northern Star. He was supportive of Canadian Indigenous peoples and worked personally and legally to support their rights. He represented the hereditary Dogrib chief Michel Siki in a groundbreaking case in support of Aboriginal Hunting Rights, until the level of the Supreme Court.

Crate later became a teacher and taught and lived in numerous small Canadian towns and on the Blackfoot reserve. He taught mainly Business English, Literature and Social Studies, which he augmented by his research and teaching of Native Indian history.  He donated some of his collection of old Canadiana literature and Dictionaries to the libraries in each small town he lived in.

Crate was known for his defence of those who kept views considered to be 'inflammatory'. Among the more controversial aspect of this was speaking out in defence of Eastern European immigrants who either expressed inflammatory views of World War II or possibly had been accused of war crimes.

Death 
He died in 1992 at the age of 76 and is survived by two daughters and a son born to his second wife which he willed to be named Hitler.

References

Canadian fascists
1916 births
1992 deaths
Royal Canadian Navy personnel of World War II